N-Acetylgalactosamine (GalNAc),  is an amino sugar derivative of galactose.

Function
In humans it is the terminal carbohydrate forming the antigen of blood group A.

It is typically the first monosaccharide that connects serine or threonine in particular forms of protein O-glycosylation.

N-Acetylgalactosamine is necessary for intercellular communication, and is concentrated in sensory nerve structures of both humans and animals.

GalNAc is also used as a targeting ligand in investigational antisense oligonucleotides and siRNA therapies targeted to the liver, where it binds to the asialoglycoprotein receptors on hepatocytes.

See also
 Galactosamine
 Globoside
 (N-Acetylglucosamine) GlcNAc

References

External links

Acetamides
Hexosamines
Membrane biology